Kalisizo General Hospital, also Kalisizo Hospital, is a hospital in the Central Region of Uganda.

Location
The coordinates of the hospital are:0°32'08.0"S, 31°37'22.0"E (Latitude:-0.535543; Longitude:31.622779).

Overview
Kalisizo General Hospital is government regional referral hospital with a bed capacity of 120. The hospital treats many cases of malaria, particularly among children. As with most government hospitals in the country, Kalisizo hospital has challenges related to lack of appropriate medical equipment, lack of blood, and lack of appropriate medicines.

See also
List of hospitals in Uganda

References

External links
 Website of Uganda Ministry of Health
 Biikira Health Centre III, Kalisizo Hospital Fight Over Ambulance

Hospitals in Uganda
Kyotera District
Central Region, Uganda